Azospirillum doebereinerae is a species of nitrogen-fixing bacteria associated with the roots of Miscanthus species. Its type strain is GSF71T (= DSM 13131T; reference strain Ma4 = DSM 13400).

References

Further reading

Kim, Chungwoo, et al. "Wheat root colonization and nitrogenase activity by Azospirillum isolates from crop plants in Korea." Canadian Journal of Microbiology 51.11 (2005): 948–956.
Elmerich, Claudine, and William Edward Newton, eds. Associative and endophytic nitrogen-fixing bacteria and cyanobacterial associations. Vol. 5. Springer, 2007.

External links

LPSN
Type strain of Azospirillum doebereinerae at BacDive -  the Bacterial Diversity Metadatabase

Rhodospirillales
Bacteria described in 2001